Man of Destiny is a 1963 Australian television play directed by Christopher Muir. It was based on the 1897 play Man of Destiny by George Bernard Shaw. Just like the play it revolves around the early career of Napoleon Bonaparte.

Plot
In Tavazzano in May 1796, after the battle of Lodi, Napoleon meets a young Lady who he believes could be a spy, but to whom he is attracted.

Cast
Edward Hepple as Napoleon
Felicity Young as the Lady
Stewart Weller as Guiseppe Grando
David Mitchell as the Lieutenant

Production
It was Hepple's first production in Melbourne though he had done numerous TV plays such as The Square Ring, The Little Woman and The Patriots. While he made the production he rehearsed a Shaw play at the Union Theatre, Arms and the Man and The No Hoper. "I've never acted in a Shaw play before and here I am in two," said Hepple. "My greatest difficulty is the scarcity of books on Napoleon at this part of his life."

Reception
The Sydney Morning Herald said director Muir "thew away much of the impact" of the central situation bu casting Edward Hepple as Naploeon saying Heple "in many ways an excellent actor  but he is better at portraying craftiness than common sense" and saying it was " an outwardly competent production that missed most of the special slang and flavour of Shaw's view of history."

1967 Production
The play was re filmed by the ABC in 1967 as an episode of Love and War. That aired on 13 September 1967 (20 September 1967 in Brisbane).

It was filmed in Melbourne, Patrick Barton directed.

Cast

Brian Hannon as the Young Napoleon
Anne Charleston as the Young Lady
Dennis Miller as the lieutenant
Stanley Page as the innkeeper

References

External links
Man of Destiny at National Film and Sound Archive

Australian television plays
Films based on works by George Bernard Shaw
Depictions of Napoleon on film
Films set in France
Films set in 1796
1962 television plays
1962 in Australian television
Films directed by Christopher Muir